William Dunn Knox (1880–1945) was an Australian artist.

Knox was born in Adelaide and trained at the National Gallery of Victoria school, Melbourne, under Lindsay Bernard Hall 1917–21. In 1918 he became a member of the Victorian Artists Society, later on the council and in 1919 was elected to the Australian Art Association, later on the council.

Knox's first exhibition was in 1918 at the Australian Art Association, Melbourne.

Gallery that hold his paintings include: the National Gallery of Australia, Canberra; the National Gallery of Victoria, Melbourne, the Art Gallery of South Australia, Adelaide and the Art Gallery of Western Australia, Perth.

References
William Dunn Knox (1880–1945) at Eva Breuer Art Dealer

Additional sources listed at Eva Breuer Art:

The Art of W.D. Knox, McClelland Regional Gallery catalogue, 1983
Who's Who in Australia, 1938

1880 births
1945 deaths
20th-century Australian painters
20th-century Australian male artists
Artists from Adelaide
Australian male painters
National Gallery of Victoria Art School alumni